Ysengrinia is an extinct genus of carnivoran in the family Amphicyonidae (beardogs), which lived in Europe, Asia, and North America during the Early Miocene. It was also reported from Egypt and Namibia, but this material has been reassigned to other genera of beardogs (Namibiocyon and Mogharacyon).

Description 
In North America, Ysengrinia was part of the faunal turnover ∼23 to 18 Ma, when native larger creodonts and carnivores (including the beardog Daphoenus) were replaced by species emigrating from Eurasia. The genus established a presence across the continent; along with the wide distribution of fossils globally, this suggests Ysengrinia was flexible in its habits. North American fossil sediments suggest that individuals often lived or found food along rivers and near waterholes. The species may have been dimorphic, with larger males (as in canids and felids) or females (as in hyaenids).

Taxonomy 

Ysengrinia seems to have been rare throughout its range; most fossils are isolated teeth and jaw or skull fragments. Material from outside North America is usually referred to Y. ginsburgi, though other species have been proposed; the fragmentary nature of the fossils and possible variation within species makes any identification at the species level difficult. The most complete fossils have been found in North America, so descriptions of the living animal are based on the North American Y. americana  (Wortman, 1901).

Several studies have suggested that Ysengrinia is polyphyletic. Cladistic analysis recovers “Ysengrinia” americana to be outside the group that includes the rest of the genus, while “Ysengrinia” valentiana is more closely related to Thaumastocyon than to the type species Ysengrinia gerandia. It is also pointed out that Y. americana has notable differences in the upper dentition compared to the rest of the genus, and displays a morphotype less adapted to hypercarnivory. Ysengrinia tolosana and Ysengrinia depereti, only known from their lower dentition, were not included in the analysis, and are in an uncertain systematic position. Y. gerandia and “Y.” valentiana both belong to the Thaumastocyoninae, while “Y.” americana may either be the sister taxon of that subfamily, or be more closely related to Amphicyonines.

Below is the cladogram based on cranial, mandibular and dental characters, after Morales et al., 2021:

{{clade|Pseudocyonopsis landesquei
         |2={{clade
            |1={{clade
                |1=Daphoenodon superbus 
                |2=Cynelos lemanensis 
            |3="Ysengrinia" americana
            |label4 =Thaumastocyoninae
            |4={{clade
                     |1=Crassidia intermedia
                     |2={{clade
                       |1=Ysengrinia gerandia
                       |2={{clade
                          |1=Peignecyon felinoides
                          |2={{clade
                             |1=Tomocyon grivensis
                             |2={{clade
                                |1="Ysengrinia" valentiana
                                |2=Agnotherium antiquum
                                |3={{clade
                                   |1=Ammitocyon kainos
                                   |2= }} }} }} }} }} }} }} }}}}

Fossils from Arrisdrift in Namibia and Moghra in Egypt have also been referred to this genus as Ysengrinia ginsburgi. This, however, has been rejected since, although the actual genera to which these fossils belong has been a topic of debate. Morlo et al. (2019) allocated the material from Arrisdrift to the genus Cynelos, as C. ginsburgi, and created the new species Cynelos anubisi for the one from Egypt. Morales et al. (2016) first referred Y. ginsburgi to the genus Afrocyon, but a later study by the same lead author erected the new genera Namibiocyon and Mogharacyon'' for the two taxa.

References

Bear dogs
Miocene carnivorans
Miocene genus extinctions
Prehistoric mammals of North America
Prehistoric mammals of Europe
Miocene mammals of Africa
Chattian genus first appearances
Prehistoric carnivoran genera